The term mangling may refer to:
 name mangling in computer software
 using a mangle as a laundry device
 changing, mutilating or disfiguring by cutting, tearing, rearranging etc.: see wikt:mangle